ROKS Yulgok Yi I (DDG-992) is the second ship of the Sejong the Great-class destroyers that was built for the Republic of Korea Navy. She was designed around the Aegis Combat System and was named after philosopher and scholar of the Joseon Dynasty, Yulgok Yi I.

Background  
The ship features the Aegis Combat System (Baseline 7 Phase 1) combined with AN/SPY-1D multi-function radar antennae.

The Sejong the Great class is the third phase of the South Korean navy's Korean Destroyer eXperimental (KDX) program, a substantial shipbuilding program, which is geared toward enhancing ROKN's ability to successfully defend the maritime areas around South Korea from various modes of threats as well as becoming a blue-water navy.

At 8,500 tons standard displacement and 11,000 tons full load, the KDX-III Sejong the Great destroyers are by far the largest destroyers in the South Korean Navy, and indeed are larger than most destroyers in the navies of other countries. and built slightly bulkier and heavier than s or s to accommodate 32 more missiles. As such, some analysts believe that this class of ships is more appropriately termed a class of cruisers rather than destroyers. KDX-III are currently the largest ships to carry the Aegis combat system.

Construction and career 
ROKS Yulgok Yi I was launched on 14 November 2008 by Daewoo Shipbuilding & Marine Engineering. She was commissioned into Republic of Korea Navy service on 31 August 2010.

RIMPAC Exercise 

Republic of Korea Navy has actively participated in the recent iterations of the Rim of the Pacific Exercise or RIMPAC, which is held biennially from Honolulu, Hawaii. The exercises seeks to enhance interoperability among Pacific Rim armed forces, as a means of promoting stability in the region to the benefit of all participating nations. ROKS Yulgok Yi I has participated in the exercises on 2012 and 2018.

Gallery

References 

Sejong the Great-class destroyers
Ships built by Daewoo Shipbuilding & Marine Engineering
2008 ships